In Mandaeism, Urfeil and Marfeil (or ʿUrpʿil and Marpʿil) are a pair of uthras (angel or guardian) in the World of Light that are always mentioned together. They are mentioned in Books 3 and 5 (Chapter 1) of the Right Ginza, as well as in Qolasta prayer 168.

In Right Ginza 5.1, Yawar Ziwa appoints Urfeil and Marfeil over the east to watch over Ur.

Etymology
The name Marfeil is cognate with the Hebrew word  , which means 'healing.'

See also
List of angels in theology
Adathan and Yadathan
Shilmai and Nidbai
Yufin-Yufafin
Xroshtag and Padvaxtag in Manichaeism

References

Pairs of angels
Uthras
Guardians of the directions